Ahmed Rasheed (born 8 June 1991) is a Pakistani cricket player.  he has played nineteen first-class and seven List A matches.

References

Living people
1991 births
Pakistani cricketers
Multan cricketers
Pakistan Customs cricketers